David Vincent Wohlabaugh (born April 13, 1972) is a former American football center who played 9 seasons for three National Football League (NFL) teams. He started in Super Bowl XXXI for the New England Patriots. Following the 1998 season, Wohlabaugh signed a 7-year contract with the expansion Cleveland Browns worth $26.25 million. At the time, this made Wohlabaugh the highest-paid center in NFL history. 

1972 births
Living people
American football centers
Syracuse Orange football players
New England Patriots players
Cleveland Browns players
St. Louis Rams players
People from Hamburg, New York
Sportspeople from New York (state)